The Turkmen Culture House is an exhibition located within the Citadel of Erbil, in the center of Erbil, northern Iraq. It was officially inaugurated on September 5, 2021.

The exhibition aims to preserve and display the culture and history of the Iraqi Turkmen, who are the third largest nationality within the people of Iraq. It occupies one of the renovated traditional buildings on the west wing of the citadel. The exhibition displays a typical model of the interior as well as the traditional and cultural components of Iraqi Turkmen in order to preserve their cultural heritage.

See also
 Erbil Stones and Gems Museum

References

Museums in Erbil
Iraqi Turkmens